The Quake II engine''' is a game engine developed by id Software for use in their 1997 first-person shooter Quake II. It is the successor to the Quake engine. Since its release, the Quake II engine has been licensed for use in several other games.

One of the engine's most notable features was out-of-the-box support for hardware-accelerated graphics, specifically OpenGL, along with the traditional software renderer. Another interesting feature was the subdivision of some of the components into dynamic-link libraries. This allowed both software and OpenGL renderers, which were selected by loading and unloading separate libraries. Libraries were also used for the game logic, for two reasons:
id could release the source code to allow modifications while keeping the remainder of the engine proprietary.
Since they were compiled for specific platforms, instead of an interpreter, they could run faster than Quakes solution, which was to run the game logic (QuakeC) in a limited interpreter.

The level format, as with previous id Software engines, used binary space partitioning. The level environments were lit using lightmaps, a method in which light data for each surface is precalculated (this time, via a radiosity method) and stored as an image, which is then used to determine the lighting intensity each 3D model should receive, but not its direction.

id Software released the source code on December 22, 2001 under the terms of the GNU General Public License v2.0 or later.

Games using the Quake II engine

Games using a proprietary license

Games based on the GPL source release

 Ports 

 Jake2 is a Java port of the Quake II engine's GPL release. It has since been used by Sun as an example of Java Web Start capabilities for games distribution over the Internet. In 2006, it was used to experiment playing 3D games with eye tracking. The performance of Jake2 is on par with the original C version.
 Yamagi Quake II is a port of Quake II to modern systems which aims to preserve the original gameplay.
 vkQuake2 is the original Quake II'' engine with additional Vulkan renderer created by Krzysztof Kondrak, a programmer from Poland. It was originally released in December 2018 under the GPLv2.

See also

List of game engines
Quake engine
Id Tech 3
Id Tech 4
Id Tech 5
Id Tech 6
First-person shooter engine

References

External links

Official Quake II engine source code, as originally released at GitHub
Official Quake II engine source code, version 3.21 at id Software

1997 software
Formerly proprietary software
Free game engines
Game engines for Linux
Id Tech
Quake (series)